The Alien is a 2016 Mexican comedy film directed by Jesús Magaña Vázquez. The film was named on the shortlist for Mexico's entry for the Academy Award for Best Foreign Language Film at the 89th Academy Awards, but it was not selected.

Cast
 Juan Ugarte as Agus

References

External links
 

2016 films
2016 comedy films
2010s Spanish-language films
Mexican comedy films
2010s Mexican films